Lopardince is a village in the municipality of Bujanovac, Serbia. According to the 2002 census, it has a population of 825 people.

References

Populated places in Pčinja District